Ashiq Khan (ASHIQ KHAN]; born 7 June 1993)

Early life
Ashiq Khan was born on 7 June in Doha, Qatar. His father is from Peshawar, Pakistan, but moved to Doha in 1970. According to Khan, his father served in the Pakistan Army, and then served in the Qatar Army in the early 1970s. Ethnically, Khan describes himself as Pathan (Pashtun). He grew up in Doha and Islamabad where he attended the Pakistan Education Centre in the former, and both the City School and the Asas International School in the latter. After high school, he attended the International Islamic University and earned his bachelor's degree in International Relations. He later opted out to pursue a career in the film industry of Doha while attending the Doha Film Institute for workshops.

Acting & film-making career

Filming with the Doha Film Institute, Doha
Ashiq Khan participated in the casting and the filming of the Doha Film Institute advertisements for the 2nd Doha Tribeca Film Festival (DTFF) in 2010. He got involved to enhance his acting abilities, inform the public about the important cultural activities taking place in that country, and to support the growing artistic and cultural development of Doha. He was also a part of the Haggle Tour "The Haggler – Financing" advertisement, playing the roles of an elf and the clown director. His role as a volunteer earned him the 'Best Volunteer' award. Meanwhile, Khan learned how to act during various film shootings and his love for filming increased because of this experience. He once tried auditioning for a role in Jean-Jacques Annaud's film Black Gold, though the coveted role was not given to him. Nevertheless, Khan attended special panels at the Doha Tribeca Film Festival 2010 entitled Emerging Actors, and Emerging Stars.

Ashiq Khan became an assistant director, production assistant and actor in a Doha Film Institute music video "Nomadination – AshwinRenju". He also had parts in the Nomadination music video screening, and in the 2011 Doha Tribeca Film Festival volunteers' video, which promotes volunteerism.

He also got an opportunity to play the role of a journalist in the second season of Taymour, a television series that was scheduled to be screened during the holy month of Ramadan 2012 by Al Jazeera Children's Channel (JCC TV).

Acting and writing workshops
In the same way, Khan took part in a workshop entitled the "Acting for the Camera with Ashraf Farah Workshop 2011", where he learned different techniques for acting in a convincing and natural manner. He also participated in a stunt workshop to show his interest and love for stunt acting. In effect, he learned how to direct and perform stunts from a professional stunt man. He also learned how to work with a film/video crew in a very professional way. On the side note, a short video of stunt acting was recorded entitled "Once upon a time in Qatar" during the workshop.
 On the other hand, Ashiq Khan wrote scripts for a 10-minute film and several 1-minute films, showing his great interest in acting.

Khan also attended the Maisha Film Lab's 4th Screenwriting Lab in Zanzibar, Tanzania. The course was tutored by accomplished film industry professionals Anjum Rajabali and Ashwini Malik, and was set up in collaboration with the Zanzibar International Film Festival.

During the Doha Tribeca Film Festival of 2011, Ashiq Khan participated in the casting and filming of advertisements for the 2011 DTFF- Supermarket Showdown. He also participated in "Harrer Harrer – Doha", a one-week story telling workshop during which the participants aimed at telling stories about the recent political turmoils in the Middle East. During the workshop, the participants recalled their personal connection to these historical events and told their personal stories, resulting in 1-minute films. The goal of the workshop was to capture the essence of the sudden changes and communicate human emotions of the actors involved. The films were then uploaded and distributed on a web platform and became part of an international exhibition at the Doha Tribeca Film Festival 2011.

At the same festival of the same year, the education team has developed a special program called "Rendez-vous". The Doha Film Institute selected Ashiq Khan to become part of the program since he was one of the top students of the year 2011. During the festival in 25–29 October, he obtained access to a one-hour one-on-one conversation with special guest Jan Uddin. Jan Uddin is an English-Bengali actor, who was featured in Black Gold (2011), Shank (2010), and Boogie (2009) among others. The meeting with Uddin proved to be valuable for Khan as it allowed him to grasp excellent insider knowledge and career guidance.

Adding to the list of his participation in the said festival, Ashiq Khan also got involved in the Comedy Workshop. Meanwhile, Khan's short films Hamour, 15 Heartbeats, Re:Move, Last 7 Minutes and his music video "Nomadination" were screened in the festival. His one-minute films The Choice and Contradiction were also screened at the festival's "Harrer, Harrer" Video Exhibition.

On 11 to 14 March 2012, Khan attended the acting workshop "From the page to the stage" at the Royal Academy of Dramatic Art to understand the dramatic elements behind a performance. In the same year, a short film entitled HAMOUR, which features Khan as the production assistant, has been selected for the Gulf Film Festival 2012 in Dubai. It was also selected to be screened on 17 and 20 November 2012 at the Middle East Studies Association Film Festival at Denver, Colorado, USA.

On the other hand, Khan played two roles, a Pakistani Pakhton and a Qatari man in Spain-based short film MAX.

Other ventures
Ashiq Khan was once a production assistant for Vice Magazine and Levi's jeans' shoot, which features epic portraits of cool creatives, celebrating 140 years of 501s. He was also a part of Doha Film Institute's new workshop, "7 days Filmmaking Challenge".

Filmography

As an actor

As director

As production assistant

As screenplay writer

See also
 Abu Dhabi Film Festival
 Al Jazeera Children's Channel
 Dubai International Film Festival
 Zanzibar International Film Festival

References

1989 births
Living people
Maisha Film Lab alumni
Pakistani male film actors